Indonesia competed at the 2011 World Aquatics Championships in Shanghai, China between July 16 and 31, 2011.

Diving

Indonesia has qualified 5 athletes in diving.

Men

Women

Open water swimming

Men

Women

Swimming

Indonesia qualified 3 swimmers.

Men

Women

Synchronised swimming

Indonesia has qualified 12 athletes in synchronised swimming.

Women

Reserve
Sheila Nur Annisa

References

Nations at the 2011 World Aquatics Championships
2011 in Indonesian sport
Indonesia at the World Aquatics Championships